is  a Japanese professional basketball executive and former player, currently serving as the general manager of the Osaka Evessa of the Japanese B.League.

Head coaching record

|- 
|- style="background:#FDE910;"
| style="text-align:left;"|Matsushita Electric
| style="text-align:left;"|1980
| 10||9||1|||| style="text-align:center;"|-|||-||-||-||
| style="text-align:center;"|JBL Champions
|- 
|- style="background:#FDE910;"
| style="text-align:left;"|Matsushita Electric
| style="text-align:left;"|1981
| 10||10||0|||| style="text-align:center;"|-|||-||-||-||
| style="text-align:center;"|JBL Champions
|- 
| style="text-align:left;"|Matsushita Electric
| style="text-align:left;"|1982
| 15||13||2|||| style="text-align:center;"|-|||-||-||-||
| style="text-align:center;"|Runners-up
|- 
|- style="background:#FDE910;"
| style="text-align:left;"|Matsushita Electric
| style="text-align:left;"|1983
| 10||10||0|||| style="text-align:center;"|-|||-||-||-||
| style="text-align:center;"|JBL Champions
|- 
|- style="background:#FDE910;"
| style="text-align:left;"|Matsushita Electric
| style="text-align:left;"|1984
| 14||14||0|||| style="text-align:center;"|-|||-||-||-||
| style="text-align:center;"|JBL Champions
|- 
|- style="background:#FDE910;"
| style="text-align:left;"|Matsushita Electric
| style="text-align:left;"|1985
| 14||11||3|||| style="text-align:center;"|-|||-||-||-||
| style="text-align:center;"|JBL Champions
|-
|- style="background:#FDE910;" 
| style="text-align:left;"|Matsushita Electric
| style="text-align:left;"|1986
| 14||13||1|||| style="text-align:center;"|-|||-||-||-||
| style="text-align:center;"|JBL Champions
|- 
|- style="background:#FDE910;"
| style="text-align:left;"|Matsushita Electric
| style="text-align:left;"|1987
| 14||12||2|||| style="text-align:center;"|-|||-||-||-||
| style="text-align:center;"|JBL Champions
|- 
| style="text-align:left;"|Matsushita Electric
| style="text-align:left;"|1988
| 15||14||1|||| style="text-align:center;"|1st in C|||-||-||-||
| style="text-align:center;"|Runners-up
|- 
|- style="background:#FDE910;"
| style="text-align:left;"|Matsushita Electric
| style="text-align:left;"|1989
| 15||13||2|||| style="text-align:center;"|1st in T|||-||-||-||
| style="text-align:center;"|JBL Champions
|- 
| style="text-align:left;"|Matsushita Electric
| style="text-align:left;"|1990
| 15||13||2|||| style="text-align:center;"|1st in C|||-||-||-||
| style="text-align:center;"|Runners-up
|- 
| style="text-align:left;"|Matsushita Electric
| style="text-align:left;"|1991
| 15||13||2|||| style="text-align:center;"|1st in T|||-||-||-||
| style="text-align:center;"|Runners-up
|- 
| style="text-align:left;"|Matsushita Electric
| style="text-align:left;"|1992
| 22||12||10|||| style="text-align:center;"|-|||-||-||-||
| style="text-align:center;"|4th
|- 
| style="text-align:left;"|Matsushita Electric
| style="text-align:left;"|1993
| 10||9||1|||| style="text-align:center;"|1st in T|||-||-||-||
| style="text-align:center;"|7th
|- 
|- style="background:#FDE910;"
| style="text-align:left;"|Matsushita Electric
| style="text-align:left;"|1994
| 16||13||3|||| style="text-align:center;"|1st in C|||-||-||-||
| style="text-align:center;"|JBL Champions
|- 
| style="text-align:left;"|Matsushita Electric
| style="text-align:left;"|1995
| 16||12||4|||| style="text-align:center;"|1st in T|||-||-||-||
| style="text-align:center;"|7th
|- 
| style="text-align:left;"|Matsushita Kangaroos
| style="text-align:left;"|2005
| 26||9||17|||| style="text-align:center;"|7th|||-||-||-||
| style="text-align:center;"|7th
|- 
| style="text-align:left;"|Matsushita Kangaroos
| style="text-align:left;"|2006
| 26||13||11|||| style="text-align:center;"|4th|||3||1||2||
| style="text-align:center;"|4th
|- 
| style="text-align:left;"|Panasonic Trians
| style="text-align:left;"|2007-08
| 35||18||17|||| style="text-align:center;"|5th|||-||-||-||
| style="text-align:center;"|5th
|- 
| style="text-align:left;"|Panasonic Trians
| style="text-align:left;"|2008-09
| 35||22||13|||| style="text-align:center;"|3rd|||3||1||2||
| style="text-align:center;"|3rd
|- 
| style="text-align:left;"|Panasonic Trians
| style="text-align:left;"|2009-10
| 42||25||17|||| style="text-align:center;"|3rd|||3||1||2||
| style="text-align:center;"|3rd
|- 
| style="text-align:left;"|Panasonic Trians
| style="text-align:left;"|2010-11
| 36||26||10|||| style="text-align:center;"|3rd|||-||-||-||
| style="text-align:center;"|-
|- 
| style="text-align:left;"|Panasonic Trians
| style="text-align:left;"|2011-12
| 42||24||18|||| style="text-align:center;"|4th|||3||1||2||
| style="text-align:center;"|4th
|- 
| style="text-align:left;"|Panasonic Trians
| style="text-align:left;"|2012-13
| 42||20||22|||| style="text-align:center;"|5th|||-||-||-||
| style="text-align:center;"|5th
|- 
| style="text-align:left;"|Kumamoto Volters
| style="text-align:left;"|2014-15
| 54||6||48|||| style="text-align:center;"|6th in Western|||-||-||-||
| style="text-align:center;"|-
|-
| style="text-align:left;"|Kumamoto Volters
| style="text-align:left;"|2015-16
| 49||13||36|||| style="text-align:center;"|10th|||-||-||-||
| style="text-align:center;"|-
|-

References

1949 births
Living people
Japan national basketball team coaches
Japanese basketball coaches
Kumamoto Volters coaches
Nagoya Diamond Dolphins coaches
Panasonic Trians players

Wakayama Trians coaches